Terry Hu (born 21 April 1953) is a Taiwanese actor, writer and translator.

Life

Early life
Hu was born Hu Yinyin in Taichung, Taiwan on April 21, 1953, with her ancestral home in Shenyang, Liaoning, the only child of Qu Shifang, and Hu Gengnian, a member of the Legislative Yuan of the Republic of China. Hu was raised in Taichung and Taipei. When she was 15, her parents divorced.

Hu attended the Christchurch School. she graduated from Fu Jen Catholic University in 1971, where she majored in German language. When she left Fu Jen Catholic University, her university students said: "Fu Jen Catholic University have no spring from now on." After graduation, Hu went abroad to study at Seton Hall University, majoring in mass communication, she also studied at a modeling school in New York City.

Acting career
Hu returned to Taiwan in 1975. At the same year, Hu first rose to prominence for playing in The Life God, a film starring Brigitte Lin.

In 1977, Hu appeared in Bai Jingrui's Far Away From Home, which earned her a Golden Horse Award for Best Supporting Actress. One year later, Hu acted in the historical film A Teacher of Great Soldiers, a film starring Chun Hsiung Ko.

Hu studied at HB Studio, majoring in acting.

In 2003, Hu attended the 40th Golden Horse Awards.

At the age of 35, Hu withdrew from entertainment industry, she appeared in 42 films during her 15 acting years.

Writing & translating career
In 1986, Hu gave up her acting career to focus on writing and translating, and became one of the pioneers of the New Age in Taiwan. She has translated the works of Jiddu Krishnamurti, Pema Chödrön, A. H. Almaas and Ken Wilber. She has emerged as “a leading figure of Taiwan’s New Age and an inventive individual in the New Age’s global dissemination,” and has described “women as being particularly receptive to New Age thought and having a vital role to play in planetary transformation.”

Personal life
On May 6, 1980, Hu married Taiwanese writer, historian and politician Li Ao. Their love story was even featured by Time. Their wedding was held in Li's living room. Hu chose her pajama as her wedding dress.

But the couple divorced on August 28, 1980, after about three months of marriage (115 days in total). Since their divorce, the two often have had mutual criticism.

On November 25, 1994, Hu gave birth to her only daughter, Hu Jiesheng, as a single mother. Hu has never publicly revealed the child's biological father.

Works

Book
 Death and the Maiden, .
 Ancient Future, .
 Immensee
 Hu Yan Meng Yu

Translation
 When Life Falls Apart, .
 Grace and Grit, .
 Freedom, Love and Action, .
 The Only Revolution and The Urgency of Change, .
 Krishnamurti: A Biography, .
 Exploration into Insight, .
 Respect for Acting, .
 The Ending of Time, .

Film

Television

Awards

References

External links

New Age Music, a translation of a chapter from Terry Hu's Ancient Future.

1953 births
Living people
Taiwanese film actresses
Taiwanese television actresses
Taiwanese female models
Writers from Taichung
Taiwanese translators
Religion in Taiwan
Taiwanese environmentalists
Taiwanese women environmentalists
Seton Hall University alumni
Fu Jen Catholic University alumni
Taiwanese Buddhists
Actresses from Taichung
Taiwanese people of Manchu descent
20th-century Taiwanese actresses
20th-century Taiwanese writers
Manchu actresses